Caraffa may refer to:

 Caraffa del Bianco, municipality in the Province of Reggio Calabria in the Italian region Calabria of southern Italy
 Caraffa di Catanzaro, town and comune in the province of Catanzaro in the Calabria region of southern Italy
 Caraffa Fine Arts Museum, an art museum in Córdoba, Argentina

People 

 Antonio Caraffa, General Commissary of the Imperial-Habsburg Army
 Emilio Caraffa, Argentine painter of the post-impressionist school
 Girolamo Caraffa, general in Spanish and Imperial service from Italian descent

See also 

 Carafa